Erik Majetschak (born 1 March 2000) is a German professional footballer who plays as a midfielder for  club Erzgebirge Aue.

Club career
Majetschak made his professional debut for RB Leipzig on 2 August 2018, coming on as a substitute in the 64th minute for Emil Forsberg in the UEFA Europa League qualifying match against Swedish club BK Häcken of the Allsvenskan, which finished as a 1–1 away draw.

On 20 June 2019, Majetschak joined Erzgebirge Aue on a three-year contract.

References

External links
 
 

2000 births
Living people
German footballers
Germany youth international footballers
Association football midfielders
2. Bundesliga players
3. Liga players
RB Leipzig players
FC Erzgebirge Aue players